Christina or Christine of Denmark may refer to:

Princesses of Denmark: 
 Christina of Denmark (1521–1590), was the daughter of Christian II of Denmark, married firstly Francesco II Sforza, Duke of Milan, and secondly Francis I, Duke of Lorraine.
 Christina of Denmark, Queen of Norway (1118-1139), daughter of Canute Lavard, married Magnus IV of Norway
 Christina of Denmark, Queen of Sweden (1120/25-1170), daughter of Björn Ironside, married Eric IX of Sweden
 One queen consort of Denmark: 
 Christina of Saxony (1461–1521), wife of John of Denmark